The Nationwide Tour Players Cup was a regular golf tournament on the Nationwide Tour from 2004 to 2009. It was played annually at the Pete Dye Golf Club in Bridgeport, West Virginia, United States. The tournament was founded in 2004 as the Pete Dye West Virginia Classic.

The 2009 purse was $600,000, with $108,000 going to the winner. Also in 2008 and 2009, the field consisted of the top 144 players on the Nationwide Tour money list.

Winners

Bolded golfers graduated to the PGA Tour via the final Nationwide Tour money list.

External links
Official site
Coverage on PGA Tour's official site

Former Korn Ferry Tour events
Golf in West Virginia
Bridgeport, West Virginia
Recurring sporting events established in 2004
Recurring sporting events disestablished in 2009
2004 establishments in West Virginia
2009 disestablishments in West Virginia